The Karry Aika is a pick-up truck that was manufactured and marketed by Chery between 2012 and 2017. It was built based on a reverse engineered Isuzu Faster (TF) chassis and similar styling.

Overview 
The Karry Aika was initially launched in October 2012, the double cab Karry Aika comes in two different versions. The Aika standard version has a 3025mm wheelbase and is 5090mm in length, while the Aika extended version rides on a 3380mm wheelbase and is 5465mm in length. The Karry Aika is manufactured in Kaifeng, Henan by Chery.

As of 2013, the Karry Aika is powered by a gasoline 2.3 liter gasoline engine built by XCE Mianyang Xinchen Engine Co., Ltd. The 2014 model year added models powered by a 2.5 liter diesel engine also from XCE Mianyang Xinchen Engine Co., Ltd. Power outputs of the engines are rated 82.5kW/3800rpm and 280Nm/1800~2600rpm respectively.

Styling controversies 
Just like the Huanghai Plutus and JAC Ruiling, the styling of the Karry Aika is controversial as the Karry Aika has a design clearly resembling the first generation Holden/ Chevrolet Colorado.

References

External links 

Official website

Aika
Cars of China
Trucks of China
Vehicles introduced in 2012
Pickup trucks
2010s cars
Rear-wheel-drive vehicles